Jackson Edwin Reasor Jr. (born November 13, 1952) is an American lawyer and politician who served as a member of the Virginia state senate from 1992 until his resignation in 1998 to become CEO of the Old Dominion Electric Cooperative.

References

External links 
 
 

1952 births
Living people
Democratic Party Virginia state senators
20th-century American politicians